James Quinton (May 5, 1821 – May 17, 1874) was a farmer, building contractor and political figure in New Brunswick. He represented St. John County in the Legislative Assembly of New Brunswick from 1866 to 1870.

Quinton supported union with Canada. He married Elizabeth Gove Tilley.

His son William A. Quinton also served in the New Brunswick assembly. He died in 1874.

References 

Members of the Legislative Assembly of New Brunswick
1821 births
1874 deaths
People from Saint John County, New Brunswick
Colony of New Brunswick people